Dethick, Lea and Holloway is a civil parish in the Amber Valley district of Derbyshire, England. The parish contains 36 listed buildings that are recorded in the National Heritage List for England. Of these, five are listed at Grade II*, the middle of the three grades, and the others are at Grade II, the lowest grade.  The parish contains the villages of Dethick, Lea, and Holloway, and the surrounding area.  Most of the listed buildings are country houses, smaller houses, cottages, and associated structures.  The other listed buildings include churches and chapels, a public house, farmhouses and farm buildings, and a bridge.


Key

Buildings

References

Citations

Sources

 

Lists of listed buildings in Derbyshire